Lard Midan (also Romanized as Lard Mīdān) is a village in Jahadabad Rural District, in the Central District of Anbarabad County, Kerman Province, Iran. At the 2006 census, its population was 183, in 34 families.

References 

Populated places in Anbarabad County